Cressa dubia is a species of amphipod within the family Cressidae. The species is found distributed in the northern Atlantic in areas such as the Tyrrhenian Sea, the North Sea, and the Irish Sea in benthic environments at depths of 31 to 330 meters. Sizes range from 3 to 6 millimeters in length.

References 

Crustaceans described in 1857
Amphipoda
Crustaceans of the Atlantic Ocean
Invertebrates of the North Sea